State Road 72 (SR 72) is a state highway in DeSoto and Sarasota County, Florida. It is the most direct route to Siesta Key when traveling west on SR 70 from Arcadia and Fort Pierce.

The western terminus is with an intersection with U.S. Route 41. The road is then 6 lanes wide from US 41 to the Interstate 75 interchange. Immediately east of Interstate 75, the road transforms from 6 lanes wide to 2 lanes wide. It crosses the Myakka River and provides access to Myakka River State Park. A block west of the eastern terminus is CR 661, an alternative of U.S. Route 17 and provides access to State Road 60 (via SR 37).  Its eastern terminus is with an intersection of SR 70 near Arcadia.

Route description

SR 72 begins at an intersection with US 41/SR 45. SR 72 passes homes and businesses as a seven-lane road with a center left-turn lane, curving east onto Clark Road at the Swift Road intersection. The road continues through developed areas, crossing South Lockwood Ridge Road, CR 773 (Beneva Road), and Sawyer Road. The state road becomes a six-lane divided highway and intersects McIntosh Road as it crosses the Legacy Trail, where the former Seminole Gulf Railway line existed. SR 72 passes more businesses and intersects Sawyer Loop Road, Honore Avenue, and Gantt Road before coming to an interchange with I-75/SR 93 near Bee Ridge.

Past this interchange, the state road narrows to four lanes before becoming a two-lane undivided road as it heads through residential areas, passing to the north of Twin Lakes Park. The road turns to the southeast and heads into a mix of wooded neighborhoods and fields, becoming an unnamed road. SR 72 curves east again and runs through rural areas of woods and swamps. The road enters Myakka River State Park and turns southeast. The state road continues through wooded swamps within the state park, heading east again. SR 72 leaves Myakka River State Park and passes through areas of fields and trees. The road crosses into DeSoto County and continues through rural areas for several more miles, intersecting CR 769. SR 72 turns northeast and passes through farmland and trees with some homes, intersecting CR 661 before ending at an intersection with SR 70 to the west of Arcadia.

In 2018, Sarasota County accepted the state’s  offer to swap responsibility for several roads (i.e. road swap) in exchange for the state to perform major improvements on River Road, one of the county’s main thoroughfares and vital evacuation routes. One of the roads as part of the swap was SR 72 from Midnight Pass Road to US 41. The state will continue to maintain the Siesta Key bridges. The road transfer was completed in September 2020.

Future
Starting in the summer of 2021, the I-75 interchange will be upgraded to a diverging diamond interchange. The project also includes noise barrier walls, sidewalks, bike lanes added along SR 72, and auxiliary lanes for both directions of Interstate 75 from the interchange to the Proctor Road overpass. The project is expected to cost around $51 million and is anticipated to be completed by summer 2023.

Major intersections

County Road 72A

County Road 72A (CR 72A) is a west-to-east suffixed alternate of SR 72. The road is named "Proctor Road," and much of it is four lanes wide. It begins as a four-lane undivided highway at US 41 and does not become a divided highway until it reaches the Sarasota County Technical Institute. At McIntosh Road, it narrows to a two-lane undivided highway. At Honore Avenue, it widens to a four-lane divided highway. After the intersection of Cattleman Road and Grove Point Boulevard, the road narrows down to a two-lane undivided highway before crossing over I-75 with no access, then returns to ground level after a power sub-station on the northeast corner of the overpass. After the intersection of a one-lane dead-end street named Falcon Place, it curves to the southeast where it will eventually meet up with its parent route at a signalized intersection with Dove Avenue. A former right of way of the road can be seen on the northeast corner of the terminus.

References

072
072
072
County roads in Sarasota County, Florida